The 2020 American Athletic Conference men's basketball tournament was the scheduled postseason men's basketball tournament for the American Athletic Conference. It was to be held at the Dickies Arena in Fort Worth, Texas. Due to the coronavirus pandemic the tournament was cancelled on March 12, 2020 – only minutes before the first game was set to begin.

Seeds
All 12 conference teams were slated to participate in the conference tournament. The top four teams received a bye into the quarterfinals. Teams are seeded by record within the conference, with a tiebreaker system to seed teams with identical conference records. Tiebreakers: win–loss record, head-to-head record, record against the highest ranked team outside of the tied teams, record against the second highest ranked team outside of the tied teams, etc.

Schedule

Bracket

References

Tournament
American Athletic Conference men's basketball tournament
American Athletic Conference men's basketball tournament
College sports tournaments in Texas
Basketball competitions in Fort Worth, Texas
American Athletic Conference men's basketball tournament
American Athletic Conference men's basketball tournament